Isaac Leiva is a Guatemalan Paralympic Athlete. He competed at the 2012 Summer Paralympics and the 2020 Summer Paralympics.

International Competitions

References

Year of birth missing (living people)
Living people
Place of birth missing (living people)
Guatemalan male athletes
Athletes (track and field) at the 2012 Summer Paralympics
Athletes (track and field) at the 2020 Summer Paralympics
Male shot putters
Male discus throwers